Col. Michael Friedsam (1860–1931) was an American philanthropist of New York City. Friedsam was the former president of B. Altman and Company and one of the premier art collectors in America at that time.

The Friedsam residence located at 44 East 68th Street was built in 1921. The five-story building fashioned in limestone was designed by Frederick Frost, with wrought ironwork by Samuel Yellin. Friedsam's collection contained numerous masterpieces by artists such as Vermeer, Rembrandt, Jan Van Eyck, and Botticelli. After Friedsam's death in 1931, the residence became a top-rated Catholic high school for girls, Dominican Academy. Many of the original architectural elements, including carved marble fireplaces, stained glass windows, and ornate woodwork, are still in place today creating a unique environment for learning.

Friedsam never married and left a fortune to the city of New York. A large part of his collection was bequeathed to the Metropolitan Museum of Art, and another part to the Brooklyn Museum of Art. Today the Brooklyn museum would like to divest some of the works but are restricted by the bequest.

The list of paintings from the MET bequest still in the collection are:

References

 1932 article about Friedsam on website of the Jewish Telegraphic Agency

1860 births
1931 deaths
American art collectors
Businesspeople from New York City
People associated with the Metropolitan Museum of Art